The Franklin by-election of 1925 was a by-election during the 21st New Zealand Parliament. The seat became vacant due to the death of the sitting Member, William Massey. It was held on 17 June 1925. Two candidates contested the seat:

Previous general election result

 
 
 
 
 
 

By-election result

Notes

References

Franklin 1925
1925 elections in New Zealand
Politics of the Auckland Region